Gerald, Gerry, or Jerry Austin may refer to:

Sportspeople
 Gerald Austin (born 1941), former American football official in the National Football League
 Gerald Austin (cricketer) (1875–1959), New Zealand cricketer
 Gerry Austin (soccer), manager of Fredericksburg Lady Gunners

Others
 Gerry Austin, fictional character in the film Goodbye Pork Pie
Jerry Austin of Cannonball (TV series)
Jerry Austin (actor) in Saratoga Trunk
Jerry Austin, namesake of Austin Valley, Antarctica